Filip Tatranský (born 6 January 2001) is a Slovak footballer who plays for Orion Tip Sereď as a midfielder.

Club career

ŠKF Sereď
Tatranský made his Fortuna Liga debut for Sereď against DAC Dunajská Streda on 9 August 2020.

References

External links
 AS Trenčín official club profile 
 
 Futbalnet profile 
 

2001 births
Living people
Sportspeople from Trenčín
Slovak footballers
Association football midfielders
ŠKF Sereď players
Slovak Super Liga players